Seong Se-hyeon (born December 2, 1990) is a South Korean curler. He competed in the 2018 Winter Olympics as the third on the South Korean men's team skipped by Kim Chang-min.

References

External links

1990 births
Living people
People from Gumi, North Gyeongsang
Curlers at the 2018 Winter Olympics
South Korean male curlers
Olympic curlers of South Korea
Universiade medalists in curling
Pacific-Asian curling champions
Universiade gold medalists for South Korea
Competitors at the 2009 Winter Universiade
21st-century South Korean people
Competitors at the 2017 Winter Universiade